Tony McKenna (born 22 August 1939) is a former Fianna Fáil member of Seanad Éireann. He was elected to the Seanad in 1987 by the Cultural and Educational Panel. He lost his seat at the 1989 election but was nominated by the Taoiseach, Charles Haughey to the 19th Seanad.

References

1939 births
Living people
Local councillors in North Tipperary
Fianna Fáil senators
Members of the 18th Seanad
Members of the 19th Seanad
Irish schoolteachers
Place of birth missing (living people)
Nominated members of Seanad Éireann